Women's Test cricket has been played since 1934, when England faced Australia in a three-match series. Since that first match, over 130 Tests have been competed. The advent of Twenty20 cricket in the early part of the 21st century has all but eliminated Test cricket from the woman's game. Thirteen players have claimed five-wicket hauls (five or more wickets in an innings) on their debut in women's Test cricket.

The only occasion on which more than one player has taken a five-wicket haul on debut in the same match was during the first women's Test match in December 1934. During this match, three players achieved the feat; Myrtle Maclagan and Mary Spear for England, and Anne Palmer for Australia. Maclagan's bowling figures of seven wickets for 10 runs are the best by any woman on Test debut, and is one of three occasions on which a player has claimed seven wickets on their women's Test debut, along with Palmer and Lesley Johnston. Betty Wilson, who was the fourth player to take five wickets in an innings on debut, is the only woman to have taken ten wickets in a match on debut. Spear's five wickets for 51 runs was the most economical bowling when taking five wickets, conceding just 0.44 runs per over. Conversely, Shubhangi Kulkarni was the most expensive, allowing 4.11 runs per over. Isobel Joyce bowled the least overs in her innings when taking a five-wicket haul, six wickets for 21 runs from 11.1 overs.

The most recent occasion on which a player took five wickets in an innings on debut was in July 2007, when South Africa's Sunette Loubser achieved the feat in a match against the Netherlands.

Key

Bowlers

Notes

References

!
Cricket records and statistics